The following is a timeline of the history of the city of Valladolid, Castile-Leon, Spain.

Prior to 20th century

 920 CE - Ordoño II of León in power.
 1074 - Castilian Pedro Ansúrez in power.
 12th century CE - Santa María La Antigua church built.
 1276 - San Pablo Church founded.
 1346 - University of Valladolid founded.
 1389 - Convento de San Benito founded.
 1453 - Execution of Álvaro de Luna at Plaza del Ochavo.
 1468 - San Pablo Church built.
 1469 - 19 October: Wedding of monarchs Ferdinand and Isabella.
 1481 - Printing press in use.
 1492 - Colegio de Santa Cruz built.
 1496 - Colegio de San Gregorio built.
 1506 - 20 May: Explorer Christopher Columbus dies in the Casa de Colon.
 1513 - 5 January: Entry into city of Ferdinand II of Aragon.
 1515 -  (church) built.
 1518 - 7 February: Coronation of Charles V of Spain.
 1527 - Philip II of Spain born in Palacio de Pimentel.
 1528 - Valladolid Royal Palace built (approximate date).
 1540 - Archivo General de Simancas established near city.
 1552 - Convent of Las Descalzas Reales active.
 1559 - 21 May: Religious auto-da-fé ritual begins.
 1561
 21 September: .
 Capital of Castile relocated from Valladolid to Madrid.
 1570 - La Magdalena church built.
 1585 - Valladolid Cathedral construction begins.
 1589 - English College founded.
 1595
 Population: 40,000
 Catholic Diocese of Valladolid established.
  (church) built.
 1601 - Court of Philip III relocated to Valladolid.
 1603 - Writer Cervantes moves to town.
 1604 -  church built.
 1610 - Expulsion of the Moriscos.
 1668 - Valladolid Cathedral consecrated.
 1808 - City sacked by French forces.
 Population: 21,000 (Census 1787)
 1813 - 4 June: City taken by English forces.
 1842 - Provincial Museum of Fine Arts founded.
 1856 - El Norte de Castilla newspaper begins publication.
 1857 - Population: 41,943.
 1861 - Lope de Vega Theatre inaugurated.
 1864 - Teatro Calderón (theatre) opens.
 1895 - Ariza-Valladolid  begins operating.
 1900 - Population: 68,789.

20th century

 1903
  (travel club) founded.
 Statue of Pedro Ansúrez erected in Plaza Mayor.
 1905 - Statue of Columbus erected in the Campo Grande.
 1924 -  (cavalry academy) built.
 1928 - Real Valladolid football club formed.
 1930 - Population: 91,089.
 1953 - Renault Valladolid Factory begins operating.
 1956 - Seminci film festival begins.
 1960 - Population: 151,807.
 1970 - Population: 236,341.
 1975
 Polideportivo Huerta del Rey (arena) opens.
 José Delicado Baeza becomes archbishop.
 1976 - CB Valladolid basketball team formed.
 1979 - Tomás Rodríguez Bolaños becomes mayor.
 1982
 Sociedad para el Desarrollo Industrial de Castilla y Leon (economic development entity) headquartered in city.
 Estadio Nuevo José Zorrilla (stadium) opens.
 1983 - City becomes part of the autonomous community of Castile and León.
 1985 - Pabellón Polideportivo Pisuerga (arena) opens.
 1991 - Population: 345,891.
 1995 - Francisco Javier León de la Riva becomes mayor.

21st century

 2003 - Valladolid Science Museum and  established.
 2007
 Madrid–Valladolid high-speed rail line begins operating.
  headquartered in city.
  built.

See also
 Valladolid history
 History of Valladolid (in Spanish)
 List of mayors of Valladolid (in Spanish)
 Architecture of Valladolid (in Spanish)
 Timelines of other cities in the autonomous community of Castile and León: Burgos, Salamanca

References

This article incorporates information from the Spanish Wikipedia.

Bibliography

in English
Published in the 18th-19th century
 
 
 

Published in the 20th century

in Spanish

External links

 Map of Valladolid, 1943

Valladolid
Valladolid